The 1896 Cornell Big Red football team was an American football team that represented Cornell University during the 1896 college football season.  In their first season under head coach Joseph Beacham, the Big Red compiled a 5–3–1 record and outscored all opponents by a combined total of 162 to 82.

Schedule

References

Cornell
Cornell Big Red football seasons
Cornell Big Red football